Frederick Charles Gray (c. 1852 – 1933) was a Labor member of the Legislative Assembly of the Parliament of Victoria for the electoral district of Prahran from 1894 to 1900.

External links
 Re-member - Parliament of Victoria at www.parliament.vic.gov.au

1933 deaths
Victoria (Australia) state politicians
Year of birth uncertain